Tim Springs Petroglyphs is an archaeological site near Indian Springs, Nevada, United States, which was listed on the National Register of Historic Places in December 1974.

References

External links
Nevada State Historic Preservation Office

Petroglyphs in Nevada
Native American history of Nevada
National Register of Historic Places in Clark County, Nevada
Archaeological sites on the National Register of Historic Places in Nevada